Allen Gordon Clapp (born August 5, 1967) is the singer, guitarist and principal songwriter for the California rock band The Orange Peels. Since 1990, he has also periodically released material under his own name and under the moniker "Allen Clapp and his Orchestra." 

Though Clapp's music is largely considered part of the Indie-pop genre, his music production techniques and lyrical content reflect a distinct sense of place—an attribute more common to indigenous folk music.

History 
Clapp was raised two blocks from the San Francisco bay in a Joseph Eichler-built home in Foster City, CA, where his mother and big sister taught him piano as a young child. He also studied the violin until his teen years, when he hooked up with likeminded musicians Dan Jewett, Larry Winther, Chris Boyke and Maz Kattuah, and formed a garage band alternately known as The Batmen and The Morsels.

The band disintegrated at the end of the 1980s, with Winther and Kattuah going on to form garage-rock band The Mummies, and Jewett leaving to form The Himalayans, a band which included a pre-Counting Crows Adam Duritz.

Clapp and Boyke split off to explore more esoteric, folky material in the duo The Goodfellows, who performed regularly around Berkeley (where Clapp had graduated in 1989 with a major in English Literature), and San Francisco. The two later added a bass player, Neal Trembath (Pullman), a drummer, Tom Freeman (The Muskrats), a harmonica player, Juliet Pries, and a manager, Alison Hefner (Dirty Deeds).  They gigged around the Bay Area as, variously, "Huck," "Hunk," and "Hulk" (cf. Spinal Tap).  Clapp released one flexi as Huck on Winter's Mist records out of San Jose.

In the midst of playing in those bands, Clapp had begun recording pop songs under his own name using a Radio Shack tie-clip microphone, a Roland RE-201 Space Echo and his Tascam Porta One four-track cassette recorder. The Roland Space Echo would become an important part of Clapp's production of musical soundscapes, helping him achieve a cool, coastal sound.

Even to the casual observer, he was barely equipped to record a decent demo tape. But Clapp's keen ear for melody and economical pop arrangements captured the interest of Kattuah, who started the Four Letter Words record label while he was in the Mummies. Four Letter Words issued Clapp's first-ever release, a song called "Very Peculiar Feeling" on a split flexi-disc with Japanese pop band "Bridge." (1990)

He followed up with his first marquis release, the one-sided 45, A Change in the Weather. The single quickly sold out, and attracted interest from the Iowa City-based Bus Stop Label. In 1992, Clapp released "Mystery Lawn," a 3-song EP on Bus Stop. Based on its success, Bus Stop owner Brian Kirk asked Clapp to release a full-length album—the label's first. In 1994, Clapp released "One Hundred Percent Chance of Rain" under the name "Allen Clapp and his Orchestra" (Bus Stop) on vinyl and CD. 

Still recording on his four track with limited equipment, the album was praised as a lo-fi masterpiece. The album's second song, "Something Strange Happens" was considered a standout track, and has since appeared on various compilations and in two independent films.

Soon after, Allen formed a band with his wife, Jill, on bass, and his old former bandmates—now former Mummies—Winther on drums and Kattuah on guitar. Minty Fresh signed the group, and after a lineup change, the band rechristened themselves The Orange Peels, who have continued to change lineups and gone on to record for SpinART and Parasol records.

"One Hundred Percent Chance of Rain" was reissued in 2000 by Bus Stop on CD and LP. Clapp released a second solo album in 2002, a spacey soft-rock exploration for March Records called "Available Light." He returned to the "Allen Clapp and his Orchestra" moniker on his 2011 album "Mixed Greens," and is now releasing a six-song collection, "Six Seasons," in November, 2016 under his own name.

In 2009, in preparation for the release of the fan-funded "2020" by The Orange Peels, Clapp formed his own label imprint: Mystery Lawn Music. Soon after, he began releasing music by other artists in the San Francisco Bay Area, many of whom had recorded at Clapp's studio. As of 2016, the label has a catalog of 20 releases and an artist roster of 18 associated acts. In late 2016, Mystery Lawn Music is slated to release its first artist compilation, "Friends & Frenemies," featuring music from the history and future of the label.

Recent Projects 
After being hit by a drunk driver on the way to the last show on The Orange Peels' Sun Moon tour in late 2013, Clapp and his wife Jill decided to move to the Santa Cruz Mountains. In spring of 2014, they bought a house on mountain in the northern San Lorenzo Valley and moved Mystery Lawn Studio into the lower level. Now called Mystery Lawn Mountain, Clapp continues to record and produce albums for like-minded musicians in Boulder Creek, California.

Clapp has engineered and produced all recordings under his own name, as well as four out of six albums by his band The Orange Peels. He has also worked as a recordist, producer and mix engineer with The Ocean Blue (Waterworks), the eclectic Santa Cruz collective The Incredible Vickers Brothers, Alison Faith Levy, and three albums by Redwood City co-eds The Corner Laughers, among others.

He recently finished production on his fourth solo release: Six Seasons, due out Nov. 11, 2016 on his own Mystery Lawn Music record label in conjunction with Minty Fresh and Redeye Distribution.

Discography 
Very Peculiar Feeling, 1990 (Four Letter Words, flexi)

A Change in the Weather, 1991 (Four Letter Words, 7" 45 rpm single)

Mystery Lawn, 1992 (The Bus Stop Label, 7" 45 rpm EP)

One Hundred Percent Chance of Rain, 1994 (The Bus Stop Label, LP, CD)

Brown Formica Table, 1995 (Elefant Records)

Whenever We're Together, 2002 (The Bus Stop Label, CD EP)

Available Light, 2002 (March Records, CD)

Something Strange Happens: Four Track Forecasts by Allen Clapp (1990–2000), 2006 (The Bus Stop Label, Digipak CD)

Mixed Greens, (Minty Fresh digital release December, 2011; Minty Fresh-Mystery Lawn vinyl and CD release, May 2012)

Six Seasons, (Minty Fresh and Mystery Lawn Music, November 11, 2016)

External links 
 Official Allen Clapp Web site
 Mystery Lawn Music official Web site
 The Orange Peels official Web site

1967 births
Living people
American rock musicians
Writers from Sunnyvale, California